Dray is both a surname and a given name. Notable people with the name include:

Julie Dray, French actress
Julien Dray (born 1955), French politician
Tevian Dray (born 1956), American mathematician
Walter Dray (1886–1973), American track and field athlete
William Herbert Dray (1921–2009), Canadian philosopher of history
Dray Skky, American songwriter
Dray Prescot, protagonist of a series of science fiction novels by Kenneth Bulmer (under the pseudonym Alan Burt Akers)